Shilese Jones (born July 26, 2002) is an American artistic gymnast.  She was a member of the teams that won gold at the 2022 World Championships and the 2018 Pan American Championships.  Individually she is the 2022 World all-around silver medalist, as well as the 2022 World uneven bars silver medalist.

Early life
Jones was born in Seattle, Washington to parents Sylvester Jones and Latrice Bryant.  She has two sisters.

Gymnastics career

Junior

2014–15 
Jones qualified to junior elite in 2014. She made her elite debut at the American Classic where she finished 29th in the all-around but fourth on vault.  She later competed at the U.S. Classic where she placed fourteenth in the all-around, seventh on vault, ninth on floor exercise, and twenty-third on uneven bars and balance beam.  At the 2014 National Championships Jones placed twentieth in the all-around.

In July 2015 Jones competed at the U.S. Classic where she finished sixth in the all-around, on vault, and on floor exercise.  The following month she competed at the 2015 National Championships where she placed tenth in the all-around, ninth on vault, fourteenth on uneven bars and floor exercise, and tenth on balance beam.

2016–17 
Jones competed at the 2016 U.S. Classic in July where she finished nineteenth in the all-around and seventh on vault.  In August she competed at the 2016 National Championships where she finished seventh in the all-around but won bronze on vault behind Chae Campbell and Madeleine Johnston and on floor exercise behind Maile O'Keefe and Riley McCusker.

Jones competed at the 2017 U.S. Classic where she placed seventh in the all-around. She was scheduled to compete at the 2017 National Championships but had to withdraw due to injury.

Senior

2018 
Jones turned senior in 2018. She competed at the American Classic where she placed first in the all-around, on vault, and on floor exercise, placed fourth on uneven bars, and twelfth on balance beam. Later in the summer she competed at the 2018 U.S. Classic where she placed fourth in the all-around behind Simone Biles, Riley McCusker, and Morgan Hurd, sixth on uneven bars, eleventh on balance beam, and fifth on floor exercise.

At the National Championships Jones finished fifth in the all-around, behind Biles, Hurd, McCusker, and Grace McCallum, sixth on uneven bars, tenth on balance beam, and seventh on floor exercise. As a result of her performance she was added to the senior national team for the first time. The following day, Jones was named to the team to compete at the Pan American Championships in Lima, Peru alongside McCallum, Trinity Thomas, Jade Carey, and Kara Eaker. In the team competition, Jones helped the United States' win the gold.

In October Jones participated in the Worlds Team Selection Camp. During the competition she placed eighth in the all-around, second on vault behind Biles, fifth on uneven bars, ninth on balance beam, and eighth on floor exercise. The following day she was not named to the team to compete at the 2018 World Championships.

2019
In February Jones was named to the team to compete at the 2019 City of Jesolo Trophy alongside Sunisa Lee, Emma Malabuyo, and Gabby Perea.  While there she contributed scores on vault, beam, and floor that helped the team win gold.

In June, after the conclusion of the American Classic, Jones was named as one of the eight athletes being considered for the team to compete at the 2019 Pan American Games along with Sloane Blakely, Kara Eaker, Aleah Finnegan, Morgan Hurd, Sunisa Lee, Riley McCusker, and Leanne Wong.

At the 2019 GK US Classic, Jones placed ninth in the all-around. She also placed third on vault behind Jade Carey and Aleah Finnegan, eleventh on uneven bars, fourteenth on balance beam, and tenth on floor exercise. After the competition she was named as the alternate for the Pan American Games.

At the U.S. National Championships, Jones placed twelfth in the all-around. She also finished fifth on vault, fourteenth on uneven bars, eleventh on balance beam, and ninth on floor exercise. She did not retain her spot on the national team, but it was announced that despite neither gymnast making the team, her and Faith Torrez had been extended invites to the worlds selection camp.  She later withdrew from the camp due to injury.

2020 
In March Jones was selected to compete at the City of Jesolo Trophy alongside Sophia Butler, Leanne Wong, and Kara Eaker. As a result she was re-added to the national team.  However, the USA decided to not send a team to Jesolo due to the COVID-19 pandemic in Italy.  In October it was announced that Jones would compete at a friendly competition in Japan taking place in November.  She competed alongside Butler and eMjae Frazier and against gymnasts from Russia, Japan, and China.

2021 
In February, Jones competed at the 2021 Winter Cup. She finished second in the all-around behind Jordan Chiles. She also finished third on bars behind Sunisa Lee and Riley McCusker, and tied for third on floor with Lilly Lippeatt.  In May Jones competed at the U.S. Classic where she only competed on vault, uneven bars, and balance beam.  She recorded the third highest single vault score behind Simone Biles and Chiles and finished 24th and 23rd on the other two apparatuses.

In August it was announced that Jones would join Biles' Gold Over America Tour.

2022 
Jones competed at the 2022 City of Jesolo Trophy alongside eMjae Frazier, Konnor McClain, Zoe Miller, and Elle Mueller. They won the team event with a score of 164.065.  Jones placed fourth in the all-around behind McClain, Asia D'Amato, and Martina Maggio.  During event finals Jones won silver on uneven bars and bronze on balance beam.  In August Jones competed at the National Championships.  She finished second in the all-around behind McClain.  She co-won the title on the uneven bars alongside Leanne Wong and outright won the national title on floor exercise.

In September Jones competed at the Paris World Challenge Cup; she only competed on uneven bars, balance beam, and floor exercise.  She qualified to all three event finals.  During event finals she won gold on uneven bars ahead of Brazil’s Rebeca Andrade, silver on floor exercise behind teammate Jordan Chiles, and placed fifth on balance beam.

In October Jones was selected to compete at the 2022 World Championships alongside Skye Blakely, Jade Carey, Jordan Chiles, and Leanne Wong.  During the qualification round Jones helped the USA qualify to the team final in first place.  Individually she qualified to the all-around and uneven bars finals.  Additionally she was the first reserve for the balance beam final.  During the team final Jones contributed scores on vault, uneven bars, and floor exercise, helping the USA win their sixth consecutive team gold medal.  During the all-around final Jones competed solid routines on all four apparatuses, earning the silver medal behind Rebeca Andrade of Brazil.  On the first day of apparatus finals Jones won silver on uneven bars behind reigning World Champion Wei Xiaoyuan.

Competitive history

References 

2002 births
Living people
African-American female gymnasts
American female artistic gymnasts
Sportspeople from Ohio
U.S. women's national team gymnasts
Medalists at the World Artistic Gymnastics Championships
People from Westerville, Ohio
21st-century African-American sportspeople
21st-century African-American women